Aurora kinase B is a protein that functions in the attachment of the mitotic spindle to the centromere.

Function 

Chromosomal segregation during mitosis as well as meiosis is regulated by kinases and phosphatases. The Aurora kinases associate with microtubules during chromosome movement and segregation. Aurora kinase B localizes to microtubules near kinetochores, specifically to the specialized microtubules called K-fibers, and Aurora kinase A (MIM 603072) localizes to centrosomes (Lampson et al., 2004).[supplied by OMIM]

In cancerous cells, over-expression of these enzymes causes unequal distribution of genetic information, creating aneuploid cells, a hallmark of cancer.

Discovery 
In 1998, Aurora kinase B was identified in humans by a polymerase chain reaction screen for kinases that are overexpressed in cancers. In the same year, rat Aurora kinase B was identified in a screen designed to find kinases that altered S. cerevisiae proliferation when overexpressed.

Expression and subcellular localization

The expression and activity of Aurora B are regulated according to the cell cycle. Expression of Aurora B reaches a maximum at the G2-M transition, whereas Aurora B protein is most active during mitosis.

Aurora B is a chromosomal passenger protein. Specifically, Aurora B localizes to the chromosomes in prophase, the centromere in prometaphase and metaphase, and the central mitotic spindle in anaphase. This localization has been determined by indirect immunofluorescence in mammalian, C. elegans, and Drosophila cells. A more detailed analysis of Aurora B localization has been carried out in mammalian cells by tagging Aurora B with green fluorescent protein. This analysis showed that the association of Aurora B with centromeres is dynamic (Aurora B at the centromere is constantly exchanging with a pool of cytoplasmic Aurora B). The analysis of tagged Aurora B also suggested that it associates with spindle microtubules during anaphase of mitosis and this association significantly limits its mobility. Finally, a portion of the tagged Aurora B localized to the equatorial cell cortex, having been transported to this location by astral microtubules.

Regulation of Aurora B
Aurora B complexes with three other proteins, Survivin, Borealin and INCENP. Each of the four components of the complex is required for the proper localization and function of the other three. INCENP stimulates Aurora B kinase activity. Survivin might do the same.

Localization of Aurora B to the centromere during prometaphase and metaphase requires phosphorylation of the mammalian kinetochore-specific histone-H3 variant centromere protein A (CENP-A). CENP-A associates with the centromere and is necessary for assembly of the kinetochore. Phosphorylation of CENP-A at serine 7 by Aurora A kinase recruits Aurora B to the centromere. Aurora B, itself, can also phosphorylate CENP-A at the same residue once it is recruited (see below).

Additionally, topoisomerase II has been implicated in the regulation of Aurora B localization and enzymatic activity. This regulatory role may be directly associated with the role of topoisomerase II in disjoining sister chromatids prior to anaphase. In topoisomerase II-depleted cells, Aurora B and INCENP do not transfer to the central spindle in late mitosis. Instead, they remain tightly associated with the centromeres of non-disjoined sister chromatids. Also, cells deficient in topoisomerase II show significantly reduced Aurora B kinase activity. Inhibition of Aurora B due to loss of topoisomerase II seems to depend on BubR1 activity (see below).

Aurora B has been shown to bind to end-binding protein 1 (EB1), a protein that regulates microtubule dynamics. Indirect immunofluorescence showed that Aurora B and EB1 colocalize during anaphase on the central spindle and in the midbody during cytokinesis. Intriguingly, EB1 overexpression enhances Aurora B kinase activity, at least in part because EB1 blocks the dephosphorylation/inactivation of Aurora B by protein phosphatase 2A.

Role in chromosome biorientation
Studies in several organisms indicate that Aurora B oversees chromosome biorientation by ensuring that appropriate connections are made between spindle microtubules and kinetochores.

Inhibition of Aurora B function by RNA interference or microinjection of blocking antibodies impairs the alignment of chromosomes at the equator of the mitotic spindle. This process of alignment is referred to as chromosome congression. The reason for this defect is a subject of ongoing study. Aurora B inhibition may lead to an increase in the number of syntelic attachments (sister chromatid pairs in which both sister kinetochores are attached to microtubules radiating from the same spindle pole). Intriguingly, expression of a dominant-negative and catalytically inactive form of Aurora B disrupted microtubule attachment to the kinetochore and prevented the association of dynein and centromere protein E (CENP-E) with kinetochores.

Numerous kinetochore targets of Aurora kinases have been determined in organisms ranging from yeast to man. Most notably, CENP-A is a target of Aurora B. The phosphorylation of CENP-A by Aurora B reaches a maximum in prometaphase. In fact, Aurora A targets the same CENP-A phosphorylation site as Aurora B, and CENP-A phosphorylation by Aurora A is thought to precede that by Aurora B. Thus, a model has been proposed in which CENP-A phosphorylation by Aurora A recruits Aurora B to the centromere, the latter maintaining the phosphorylation state of CENP-A in a positive feedback loop. Oddly, mutation of this phosphorylation site in CENP-A leads to defects in cytokinesis.

Aurora B also interacts with mitotic centromere-associated kinesin (MCAK). Both Aurora B and MCAK localize to the inner centromere during prometaphase. Aurora B has been shown to recruit MCAK to the centromere and directly phosphorylate MCAK on various residues. Phosphorylation of MCAK by Aurora B limits the ability of MCAK to depolymerize microtubules. Importantly, inhibition of MCAK by a number of approaches leads to improper attachment of kinetochores to spindle microtubules.

It has been hypothesized that tension generated by amphitelic attachment (biorientation; the attachment of sister kinetochores to opposite spindle poles) pulls sister kinetochores apart, thus disrupting the interaction of Aurora B at the innermost portion of the centromere with microtubule binding sites on the fibrous corona of the outermost centromere. Specifically, the tension generated by biorientation pulls MCAK outside of the area of Aurora B localization. Thus, mitosis proceeds upon biorientation and dissociation of Aurora B from its substrates.

Role in chromosome condensation and chromosome cohesion
Aurora B is responsible for phosphorylation of histone-H3 on serine 10 during mitosis. This modification is conserved from yeast (where the kinase is known as Ipl1) to man. Notably, histone-H3 phosphorylation by Aurora B seems not to be responsible for chromatin condensation. Though Aurora B is enriched at centromeres, it localizes diffusely to all chromatin.

In Drosophila cells, Aurora B depletion disrupts chromosome structure and compaction. In these cells, the condensin complex does not localize appropriately to the chromosomes. Similarly, in C. elegans, condensin activity is dependent on Aurora B in metaphase. However, in Xenopus egg cell-free extracts, condensin binding and chromosome condensation occur normally even in the absence of Aurora B. Likewise, after treating cells with an Aurora B enzyme inhibitor (Aurora B localization is not affected), the condensin complex localizes normally.

Aurora B localizes to the paired arms of homologous chromosomes in metaphase I of C. elegans meiosis, and perturbs microtubule dynamics in mitosis. Release of this cohesion, which is dependent on Aurora B, is required for progression to anaphase I and segregation of homologous chromosomes. In mitotic vertebrate B lymphocytes, the proper centromeric localization of a number of Aurora B binding partners requires cohesin.

Role in cytokinesis
The Aurora B complex is necessary for cytokinesis in vertebrates, C. elegans, Drosophila, and fission yeast.

In various cell types, overexpression of a catalytically inactive Aurora B prevents cytokinesis. Disruption of cytokinesis can also arise from Aurora B mislocalization due to mutation of Aurora B binding partners.

Aurora B targets a number of proteins that localize to the cleavage furrow, including the type-III intermediate filament proteins vimentin, desmin, and glial fibrillary acidic protein (GFAP). In general, phosphorylation destabilizes intermediate filaments. Therefore, it has been proposed that phosphorylation of intermediate filaments at the cleavage furrow destabilizes the filaments in preparation for cytokinesis. In agreement with this hypothesis, mutation of Aurora B target sites in intermediate filament proteins leads to defects in filament deformation and prevents the final stage of cytokinesis.

Aurora B also phosphorylates myosin II regulatory light chain at the cleavage furrow. Inhibition of Aurora B activity prevents proper myosin II localization to the cleavage furrow and disrupts spindle midzone organization.

Role in the spindle assembly checkpoint
The spindle assembly checkpoint inhibits progression of mitosis from metaphase to anaphase until all sister chromatid pairs are bioriented. Cells lacking Aurora B fail to arrest in metaphase even when chromosomes lack microtubule attachment. Consequently, Aurora B deficiency leads to progression through anaphase despite the presence of misaligned chromosomes.

Aurora B may be involved in the localization of MAD2 and BubR1, proteins that recognize correct chromosome attachment to spindle microtubules. Loss of Aurora B lowers the concentration of Mad2 and BubR1 at the kinetochores. In particular, Aurora B seems to be responsible for maintaining the localization of Mad2 and BubR1 to the kinetochore following their initial recruitment, which occurs independent of Aurora B. Aurora B may be directly or indirectly involved in the hyper-phosphorylation of BubR1 seen in mitosis in wild-type cells.

Interactions
Aurora B kinase has been shown to interact with:
 BARD1,
 BIRC5,  and
 CDCA8 
 TACC1.
FBXL2.

Role in cancer
Abnormally elevated levels of Aurora B kinase cause unequal chromosomal separation during cell division, resulting in the formation of cells with abnormal numbers of chromosomes, which are both a cause and driver of cancer.

Inhibition of Aurora B kinase by BI811283 in cancer cells leads to the formation of cells with severely abnormal numbers of chromosomes (polyploid). Counterintuitively, inhibition of Aurora B kinase actually causes the polyploid cells formed to continue dividing however, because these cells have severe chromosomal abnormalities, they eventually stop dividing or undergo cell death.

Role in axonal outgrowth and axon regeneration
A novel function for Aurora B kinase has recently been reported in neurons.  Following axotomy of cultured neurons, significant upregulation in Aurora B kinase gene expression was observed coinciding with regenerative axonal sprouting. Furthermore, overexpression of Aurora B kinase results in accelerated axonal outgrowth of spinal motor neurons in developing zebrafish.

See also
 Aurora kinase
 Aurora A kinase
 Aurora C kinase
 INCENP
 Spindle assembly checkpoint

References

Further reading

External links
 
 
 

EC 2.7.11